The 2001 Navy Midshipmen football team represented the United States Naval Academy (USNA) as an independent during the 2001 NCAA Division I-A football season. The team was led by head coach Charlie Weatherbie for most of the year.  He was replaced by Rick Lantz for the last three games of the season.

Schedule

Roster

References

Navy
Navy Midshipmen football seasons
College football winless seasons
Navy Midshipmen football